Allahabad (also Romanized as Allāhābād) is a village in Akhtarabad Rural District, in the Central District of Malard County, Tehran Province, Iran. At the 2006 census, its population was 107, in 31 families.

References 

Populated places in Malard County